This is a list of Serbian European Film Award winners and nominees. This list details the performances of Serbian actors, actresses, and films that have either been submitted or nominated for, or have won, a European Film Award including Serbian co-productions.

Main categories

See also
 List of Serbian submissions for the Academy Award for Best Foreign Language Film

External links
 Nominees and winners at the European Film Academy website

European Film Award winners
European Film Academy Awards